The State School Teachers Union of W.A. (Inc.) (SSTUWA) is an Australian trade union. It represents teachers working in the Western Australian state school system, which includes public schools and TAFE institutes, and is affiliated with the federal Australian Education Union. It has been in continuous existence since 1898.

Purpose 
The SSTUWA has a number of roles, including
 Negotiating conditions of employment and salaries, with the Department of Education, for public school teachers working under the School Education Act Employees' Agreement (Teachers and Administrators).
 Negotiating conditions of employment and salaries for TAFE lecturers working under the Western Australian TAFE Lectures' General Agreement.
 Advocating for improvements in the Western Australian state school system at a local, state and federal level.

References

External links
Official website

Trade unions in Western Australia
Education trade unions
Trade unions established in the 1890s
Teaching in Australia
Australian Public Sector Trade Unions